Robert Peter Jones (born 3 November 1995) is an English cricketer who plays for Lancashire County Cricket Club. He is a right-handed batsman who also bowls right-arm leg spin.

He made his first-class debut for Lancashire, on 23 August 2016, against Surrey. He made his Twenty20 cricket debut for Lancashire in the 2017 NatWest t20 Blast on 16 August 2017. He made his List A debut for Lancashire in the 2018 Royal London One-Day Cup on 31 May 2018.

References

External links
 
 

1995 births
Living people
Cheshire cricketers
Cricketers from Warrington
English cricketers
Lancashire cricketers